Spring Creek Church is a large church located in Pewaukee, Wisconsin. The church is autonomous and independent of any denominational control.

History 
The church was founded in 1881 as Garfield Baptist Church when a small group of Christians started a mission church. The church's earliest days unfolded in a small, wooden-frame building on the corner of Second Street and Garfield Avenue in Milwaukee.

By 1951 a new building was added adjacent to the old one, housing the growing number of congregants. In 1964, continued growth mandated another move, this time to the suburb of Wauwatosa. In the decades to follow, a Bible school and an AWANA program trained children. Involvement in worldwide missions also expanded to include dozens of families serving around the globe.

In 1987, William "Chip" Bernhard was installed as senior pastor. Under Bernhard, the 1990s were marked by growth. In October 1997, the congregation drove down Capitol Drive to the new facility. In 2001, the congregation voted to change the name of the church to Spring Creek Church, which better reflected the new location and the church's desire to reach beyond its traditional Baptist roots.

Also in 2001, Spring Creek completed the Building for the Harvest capital campaign and opened a new $4.2 million 850-seat worship center. After doubling attendance in the decade since moving to Pewaukee, in early 2008, construction began on the And 1 campaign, which included a $6 million expansion to the worship center (increasing capacity to nearly 2,000), a new foyer, bookstore, coffee bar, and Christian education wing. The project was completed in January 2009.

References

External links
Official church website

Evangelical churches in Wisconsin
Churches in Waukesha County, Wisconsin
Evangelical megachurches in the United States
Religious organizations established in 1881
19th-century churches in the United States
1881 establishments in Wisconsin